Stockley is an unincorporated community in Sussex County, Delaware, United States. Stockley is southeast of Georgetown.

References

Unincorporated communities in Sussex County, Delaware
Unincorporated communities in Delaware